Physalospora perseae is a fungal plant pathogen infecting avocados.

References

External links
 Index Fungorum
 USDA ARS Fungal Database

Fungal plant pathogens and diseases
Avocado tree diseases
Xylariales